Bobby Lewis (born May 9, 1942) is an American country music singer-songwriter. Between 1963 and 1985, Lewis released ten albums and charted more than twenty-five songs on the Billboard Hot Country Singles chart. His biggest hit, "How Long Has It Been", peaked at No. 6 in 1966. Lewis released a 26 country charted singles from 1966 to 1985.

Lewis earned the title "The Boy with the Lute" for his usage of a six-string guitar-lute, and was inducted to the Atlanta Country Music Hall of Fame on November 29, 2014. He became a member of the Grand Ole Opry and continues to perform and record new material.

Discography

Albums

Singles

References

External links

1942 births
Living people
People from Hodgenville, Kentucky
American country singer-songwriters
American male singer-songwriters
Country musicians from Kentucky
United Artists Records artists
Singer-songwriters from Kentucky